Cut is a commune located in the southeastern part of Alba County, Transylvania, Romania. It is composed of a single village, Cut.

Cut was first attested in 1291, under the name terra Kut.

The commune has a railway station that serves the CFR Line 200.

According to the census from 2011 there was a total population of 1,075 people living in this commune, of which 97.3% are ethnic Romanians and 1.58% are ethnic Romani.

Septimiu Albini (1861–1919) spent his childhood in Cut, where his family originated from. The primary school in Cut is named after Albini and features a medallion with his likeness, while a statue of him stands before the mayor's office.

References

Communes in Alba County
Localities in Transylvania